Sean Safo-Antwi (born 31 October 1990 in London) is a Ghanaian sprinter. He competed for Great Britain before switching allegiance to Ghana in early 2016, a move that the British Federation did not oppose. He was due to represent Ghana for the first time at the 2016 World Indoor Championships but was withdrawn at the last minute. In 2016 he represented Ghana in the 100 metres at the 2016 Summer Olympics in Rio de Janeiro, Brazil.

He competed for Ghana at the 2020 Summer Olympics in the men's 4 x 100 metres relay.

Competition record

1Disqualified in the final

Personal bests
Outdoor
100 metres – 10.12 (+1.8 m/s, London 2022)
200 metres – 20.76 (+0.3 m/s, Newham 2016)

Indoor
60 metres – 6.55 (Mondeville 2016)

References

External links
 

1990 births
Living people
British male sprinters
Ghanaian male sprinters
Place of birth missing (living people)
Athletes (track and field) at the 2016 Summer Olympics
Olympic athletes of Ghana
Athletes (track and field) at the 2018 Commonwealth Games
Athletes (track and field) at the 2019 African Games
Commonwealth Games competitors for Ghana
African Games competitors for Ghana
Athletes (track and field) at the 2020 Summer Olympics
African Games medalists in athletics (track and field)
African Games gold medalists for Ghana
Athletes (track and field) at the 2022 Commonwealth Games